Harry Lee (朱家祥, pinyin:  Zhū Jiāxiáng; August 27, 1932 – October 1, 2007) was the long-time sheriff of Jefferson Parish, Louisiana. He was first elected in 1979 as the thirtieth sheriff, and was re-elected six times, having served twenty-eight years and six months.

Early years
Lee was the son of Chinese immigrants from Taishan, in the Pearl River Delta region of Guangdong province, southern China. He was born in the back room of the family's laundry on Carondelet Street, in the part of New Orleans known as Central City. When they were old enough, he and his siblings, eventually numbering eight, were given jobs in the laundry and later in the family's restaurants, including the House of Lee in Metairie.

He got a firsthand taste of politics early, at age 12, when he was elected president of the newly formed student body government at Shaw Elementary School. Each year after that, he was elected to class office. During his senior year at Francis T. Nicholls High School (now KIPP Renaissance High School) in the Ninth Ward of New Orleans, he was president of both his senior class and the student body, a school first.

He earned a bachelor's degree in geology from Louisiana State University in Baton Rouge and served in the United States Air Force in Texas and married Lai Lee, then returned to Louisiana in 1959. That was the year when the family began construction on the House of Lee, where Mr. Lee would meet the man who became his political mentor, Hale Boggs. For six years he worked as Boggs' driver and confidant when the congressman was back home in Louisiana.

Soon, Lee decided that public service was the career for him and saw law school as an entree. He took classes at Loyola University School of Law while working 12-hour days at the family's restaurant.

After law school, he set up a small practice with classmate Marion Edwards, now an appellate judge. With Boggs' help, he was appointed the first magistrate for the U.S. District Court in New Orleans, and in 1975 he became chief attorney for Jefferson Parish.

Four years later, with Sheriff Al Cronvich embroiled in a wire-tapping scandal, Lee saw a chance to plunge into electoral politics. Assailing the corruption and inefficiency of the Sheriff's Office, he ran as a reform candidate, led the five-candidate primary and took 57 percent of the runoff vote to defeat Cronvich.

He immediately gave deputies raises and poured money into the Sheriff's Office, computerizing it for the first time. He also began to build a political machine that would become one of the largest in southern Louisiana, although his record of getting others elected was spotty.

Controversies

By the late 1980s, as fear of crime became Jeffersonians' No. 1 concern, Lee sensed his continued political fortunes would have less to do with reforming the Sheriff's Office than in making his suburban constituents feel safe from the big city ills.
Their fears were often expressed in stark racial terms, and they found vent for a time in the divisive rhetoric of an aspiring politician named David Duke, whom Metairie residents sent as one of their representatives to the state legislature.

Once Lee was accused of trying to separate the races by issuing an order erecting a barricade on a street at the line dividing majority-black New Orleans and majority-white East Jefferson. Mr. Lee turned the story—although false—into political capital. "Depending on who I'm talking to", he said, "I either take credit for the barricade or I don't." On another occasion, he defended his decision to yank deputies out of an all-black neighborhood in Avondale after residents complained about police brutality.

When an 8-year-old girl was raped in March 1998, the police initially described two black males as the culprits. Lee was criticized for declaring every black man in the subdivision a suspect. He apologized for any offense but insisted the practice was not racist. In fact, friends said the sheriff was so personally shaken by the vicious attack on the girl, who was also black, that he pulled out all the stops to solve the case.

"I'm going to catch that bastard, and when I catch him, he is going to be black," he said. "I just don't give a damn what people think of me anymore. If that was their daughter and we weren't doing that, they would be on our ass." Several days later, he personally placed the girl's stepfather under arrest for the rape. In 2003, a jury sentenced the stepfather to death.

Despite the apparent missteps, his popularity grew from the time he took office, particularly among whites. In 1994, a survey for The Times-Picayune showed that 84% of Jefferson Parish residents had a favorable impression of the sheriff, including 91% of whites. The same poll showed that, while almost nine out of 10 people thought he "tells it like it is", six of 10 thought he should sometimes keep his mouth shut.

Lee's widespread popularity gave him some political capital in the face of criticism about his management of the Sheriff's Office. A 1993 study by one government watchdog group lambasted his handling of the Sheriff's Office then-$60 million budget; the same group gave him higher marks in a follow-up study a few years later. 

The worst political scare of his career had to do with crime and nothing to do with race, his fiscal management, or his controversial remarks. It came in 1985, when voters learned that a convicted rapist named Brian Busby was allowed to wander Jefferson Parish unsupervised during the day, instead of being locked down in state prison elsewhere. Mr. Lee had granted Busby special privileges as a favor to a Parish Council member. Ten days after the disclosure, Busby was sent to the Louisiana State Peniteniary at Angola. Lee's approval rating plunged. A year later, however, after a series of Metairie robberies in which white shoppers were followed to their homes and held up at gunpoint in their driveways by black men, Lee made the following statement, which either almost ended or saved his career:

If there are some young blacks driving a car late at night in a predominantly white neighborhood, they will be stopped.  There's a pretty good chance they're up to no good. It's obvious two young blacks driving a rinky-dink car in a predominantly white neighborhood—I'm not talking about on the main thoroughfare, but if they're on one of the side streets and they're cruising around—they'll be stopped.

Outrage was immediate, and Mr. Lee quickly cancelled the order and apologized as the NAACP called for his resignation. When he ran for his third term the next year, however, Lee failed to win the primary, but defeated Art Lentini in the runoff with 54 percent of the vote.

Gambling
Lee defended gambling and claimed abuses were no more severe that those with addictions to alcohol and tobacco. He earmarked gambling revenues for jail buildings and maintenance. Without video poker, Lee said that Jefferson Parish would lose nearly $4 million annually in public revenues.

Legal career
After being honorably discharged from the air force in 1959, Lee returned to Louisiana to manage his father's restaurant, The House of Lee. Lee was elected president of the New Orleans Chapter of the Louisiana Restaurant Association in 1964. His leadership was instrumental in the peaceful racial integration of New Orleans restaurants, in compliance with the Civil Rights Act of 1964.

At this time, he also attended Loyola University New Orleans School of Law, where he was elected president of the student chapter of the Bar Association.  Lee graduated in 1967 and started a small law practice in Gretna with Loyola classmate Marion Edwards (not to be confused with the brother of future Governor Edwin Washington Edwards - whom Lee was a very avid supporter of - who shares the same name).

Lee was appointed as a magistrate judge for the United States District Court for the Eastern District of Louisiana in 1971. He was elected president of the National Council of United States Magistrates in 1973.  He was invited to join the congressional delegation to the People's Republic of China in 1972, which was led by House Majority Leader Hale Boggs from Louisiana, and House Minority Leader and future U.S. President Gerald Ford.  He resigned as a Federal Magistrate in 1975 and was appointed Parish Attorney for Jefferson Parish.

Political career
Lee was elected sheriff in 1979, having defeated long-time incumbent Alwynn Cronvich. He was re-elected every four years from 1983 through 2003.  In 1987, Lee faced a strong election challenge from Republican Art Lentini (later a state senator), and he was forced into a general election, but he managed to win by 54-46 percent. He was re-elected with no significant opposition in subsequent elections, and he remained a political celebrity within Jefferson Parish. He was credited with keeping the crime rate low for the past twenty-five years, while the rate in neighboring Orleans Parish remains one of the highest in the nation.

In 1989, Lee deplored the choice of David Duke and John S. Treen standing as Republicans for the vacancy in state House District 81 created by the resignation of Charles Cusimano, who became a state court judge. To Lee, the showdown in the special election was a choice between "a bigot and an asshole."
   
A Democrat, Lee ran for governor in 1995 but dropped out before the primary. He famously said, "why would I want to be governor when I can be king?" Lee endorsed Mike Foster, a Republican who came from behind in the polls to win the governorship and to serve two terms. He also endorsed Bobby Jindal for governor in 2003, his bid for Congress in 2004, 2006 reelection and again for governor in 2007.

Lee, one of the best-known politicians in the Greater New Orleans Area, was known as a zealous crime fighter. He also gained a reputation as an anti-corruption reformer while serving as the Parish Attorney for Jefferson Parish. Lee was a political insider in Louisiana, and had close personal contacts with former Governor Edwards and the Boggs family in New Orleans. He often made controversial statements to the local media.  He showed unwavering loyalty to his deputies during allegations of police brutality in Jefferson Parish.  He had also shown support for other Louisiana politicians during several federal investigations of government corruption, including the investigation and eventual conviction of Edwards.  Many of these politicians were personal friends of Lee, but  Lee himself was never accused of corruption.

Lee's family is affiliated with the Chinese Presbyterian Church in Kenner. Since his death, unused funds totalling more than $250,000 from his campaign war chest have been donated to the church in accordance to his will. Lee and his wife Lai have one daughter, Jefferson Parish President Cynthia Lee Sheng, and two grandchildren.

Hurricane Katrina
Sheriff Lee maintained a strong presence during Hurricane Katrina.  Most memorably, the morning before Katrina hit New Orleans, Lee appeared on emergency radio, with a message for those who had not yet evacuated: "You better haul ass! Y'all should have left yesterday." The previous evening, he had let the community know that his birthday party had been cancelled.

Lee was one of the few New Orleans politicians to maintain his pre-Katrina popularity.  During the storm, Parish President Aaron Broussard evacuated all parish personnel directly under his control to St. Tammany Parish on the Northshore, including the drainage pump operators.  This is widely considered the primary cause of flooding on the Eastbank of Jefferson Parish.  However, the Sheriff's Office in Jefferson Parish is independent of the Parish President and operates directly under an elected sheriff.

When storm conditions dissipated, Jefferson Parish deputies immediately began patrolling all major commercial roads and even individual neighborhoods in the Parish.  Most of the Parish at this time had been evacuated, and communications were nearly non-existent.  Parish deputies were the only form of security in the Parish in the first week after the storm.

Most of the looting that did take place in Jefferson Parish occurred in Terrytown and Gretna, which borders on Algiers and the Crescent City Connection.  The Jefferson Parish Sheriff's Office has jurisdiction over all of unincorporated Jefferson Parish, while incorporated cities such as Gretna, Kenner, Harahan and Westwego have their own independent city governments and police departments.  In the first week after the storm, Sheriff Lee and Gretna Police Chief Arthur Lawson Jr ordered Gretna police officers and Jefferson Parish deputies to set up a roadblock on the Crescent City Connection and prevent New Orleans evacuees from crossing. This action has been praised by some Gretna residents but criticized by many Orleans Parish elected officials. Lee was named as a co-defendant in the subsequent lawsuits, as he was directly involved in ordering the bridge barricaded.

Personal life 
Lee is the older brother of Playboy magazine's first Asian-American centerfold, China Lee.

Death 
Lee died five days after returning from M.D. Anderson Cancer Center in Houston for his latest round of treatment for leukemia. His death came less than three weeks before he hoped to win an eighth term in office. Lee had qualified to run in the October 20 primary against Harahan Police Chief Peter Dale and contractor Julio Castillo. State law requires qualifying to reopen if a candidate dies before the election is held.

On September 30, WWL-TV reported that Lee was hospitalized in serious condition due to complications from leukemia. Lee was reportedly having breathing problems and was taken to the Ochsner Medical Center. He died at 10:44 a.m. on October 1, 2007, and was interred four days later at Metairie Cemetery in New Orleans.

Shortly after Lee's death, the primary election for sheriff was moved from October 20 to November 17, and Newell Normand, a Republican, was appointed as the interim sheriff.  Normand, who had been the chief deputy since 1995, was elected as the sheriff with over 90% of the vote and held the office until 2017.

In 2001, Lee was inducted into the Louisiana Political Museum and Hall of Fame in Winnfield. Only five other sheriffs have been so designated, Cat Doucet, Charles Fuselier, Leonard R. "Pop" Hataway, Jessel Ourso, and William Earl Hilton.

References

Further reading
Wild About Harry:  A Biography of Harry Lee.  Deno Seder (2001).  Edition Dedeaux.  .

External links
 Jefferson Parish Sheriff's Office
"Larger-Than-Life Sheriff Rules Louisiana Parish", John Burnett, All Things Considered, National Public Radio, November 28, 2006

1932 births
2007 deaths
Louisiana sheriffs
American jurists of Chinese descent
American military personnel of Chinese descent
American politicians of Chinese descent
Asian-American people in Louisiana politics
Louisiana Democrats
People from Metairie, Louisiana
Law enforcement in Louisiana
Deaths from leukemia
Francis T. Nicholls High School alumni
Louisiana State University alumni
Lawyers from New Orleans
Deaths from cancer in Louisiana
Burials at Metairie Cemetery
20th-century American politicians
United States Air Force generals
History of racism in Louisiana
20th-century American lawyers
Right-wing populism in the United States
African-American–Asian-American relations